The 1978 Richmond Spiders football team was an American football team that represented the University of Richmond as an independent during the 1978 NCAA Division I-A football season. In their fifth season under head coach Jim Tait, Richmond compiled a 3–8 record.

Schedule

References

Richmond
Richmond Spiders football seasons
Richmond Spiders